Gilsland Spa is the present-day name of a hotel at Gilsland, Cumbria, England.  It is named from the sulphurous spring which issues from a cliff below the hotel.

The original hotel was called The Shaws, from an Old English word meaning a small woodland, and was built in the  1760s, although the site and its surrounding farmland have been known by this name since at least 1603. Lord William Howard's map of the Barony of Gilsland of this date shows two buildings near the site of the hotel labelled "Two tenements called the Shaws". Very little is known about the first hotel but one contemporary drawing suggests that it may have had a tower in imitation of the type of fortified house known locally as a peel.

This original Shaws Hotel burned down spectacularly in 1859, and was replaced on a grander scale soon afterwards by G. G. Mounsey, a local landowner and first elected mayor of Carlisle.  Around this time, Rose Hill railway station was renamed Gilsland, and the surrounding collection of hamlets became the village of Gilsland, but the hotel continued to be called The Shaws until it was leased to the Gilsland Spa Hotel and Hydro Company of South Shields in 1893.  Expensive renovations, including an improved water supply, crippled this company financially, and it failed in 1900.  
The Co-operative Wholesale Society took over in 1901 to run it as a convalescent home, the Co-operative Group being principal shareholders in the business. The present-day management welcome the use of its large car park by visitors wishing to enjoy the dramatic wooded gorge, and offer food, drink and accommodation. Gilsland Spa has a sister hotel, The Esplanade, in Scarborough, Yorkshire. The two hotels were sold by the Co-op in December 2017 and the new owners Northern Powerhouse Developments planned major refurbishments.

The hotel has been a popular resort since the eighteenth century.  Susanna Blamire, the Cumbrian Muse, came to take the waters in the later part of the century and Walter Scott came here in "the season" of 1797 looking for a wife, and found one.  The opening of the railway station in 1836 galvanised the village and during the later part of the 19th century and the early 20th, Gilsland was thronged with tourists, many of whom were working-class people from Tyneside.  Reviewers of the hotel repeatedly stressed the free and easy way in which the different classes mixed. One of the main attractions, though for reasons no-one is prepared to admit, has been the Popping Stone, an enigmatic stone some half a mile from the hotel in a secluded glade, linked to various courtship and fertility rituals.  Next to the stone was the Kissing Bush, an ancient hawthorn which died in the 1940s. These relics and two mineral springs (sulphurous and chalybeate) are situated along the network of wide footpaths known as the Home Walks which provide access to the rugged scenery of the hotel grounds.
During its time the hotel has been a First World War military convalescent home and a Second World War maternity hospital and was known locally until recently as "The Home".

References

 Lamb, J. n.d. c2001. Gilsland Spa - A Co-operative Centenary History; Co-operative Society

External links

Official site

Co-operatives in the United Kingdom
Hotels in Cumbria
Springs of England